Lucie Lefebvre (born 1956) is a Canadian artist.

Her work is included in the collections of the Musée national des beaux-arts du Québec and the National Gallery of Canada.

References

1956 births
Living people
Artists from Quebec City
20th-century Canadian women artists
21st-century Canadian women artists
Université Laval alumni